Sanjabid-e Rayegan (also Romanized as Sanjābīd-e Rāyegān; also known as Rāyegān, Rāygān, Sanjābī, and Sinjābi) is a village in Howmeh Rural District, in the Central District of Harsin County, Kermanshah Province, Iran. At the 2006 census, its population was 208, in 46 families.

References 

Populated places in Harsin County